Spilarctia flavorubida is a moth in the family Erebidae. It was described by Vladimir Viktorovitch Dubatolov in 2006. It is found on Bali.

References

Moths described in 2006
flavorubida